Count Carl Peter Bastiat Hamilton (born 1 January 1946 in Gothenburg) is a Swedish count, economist and politician.

He has been a Member of Parliament for the Liberal People's Party from 1997 to 1998, and again since 2002. He sits in the parliament's Committee on the Labour Market and is vice-chair of the Committee on EU Affairs. He is also a member of the party board of the Liberal People's Party.

From 1993 to 1994 he served as an Undersecretary of State at the Swedish Ministry of Finance.

Hamilton holds a doctorate in economics from London in 1974. From 1992 to 1997 he served as a professor in economics at the Stockholm University. During the mid '90s he worked as chief economist at Handelsbanken. He has been a part-time professor in international economics at the Stockholm School of Economics since 1999.

External links
Carl B. Hamilton at the Liberal People's Party
Carl B. Hamilton at the Riksdag

1946 births
Academic staff of the Stockholm School of Economics
Living people
Members of the Riksdag 1994–1998
Members of the Riksdag 1998–2002
Members of the Riksdag 2002–2006
Members of the Riksdag 2006–2010
Members of the Riksdag 2010–2014
Members of the Riksdag from the Liberals (Sweden)
People from Gothenburg
Swedish counts
Swedish economists
Swedish people of Scottish descent